Static Peak Divide is a pedestrian mountain pass located in the Teton Range, Grand Teton National Park, in the U.S. state of Wyoming. The Static Peak Divide is the highest altitude mountain pass along any maintained trail in Grand Teton National Park and is just west of Static Peak.

References

Mountain passes of Wyoming
Mountain passes of Teton County, Wyoming